North County Dublin may refer to:

 Fingal, a county of Ireland, formed in 1994 as one of three successor counties to County Dublin
 Dublin County North, a Dáil constituency created in 1969 and abolished in 1981
 Northside, Dublin, the part of Dublin city north of the River Liffey